Hopetounia is a genus of moths of the family Erebidae. The genus was erected by Charles Swinhoe in 1902.

Species
Hopetounia albida Hampson, 1926 Australia
Hopetounia carda Swinhoe, 1902 Western Australia
Hopetounia marginata Hampson, 1926 Kenya
Hopetounia pudica (Lower, 1903) Western Australia

References

Calpinae
Noctuoidea genera